NorthWest Shopping Centre is a shopping mall located in Westgate, a suburb in the northwest of Auckland, New Zealand. It is situated on the other side of Fred Taylor Drive from the pre-existing Westgate Shopping Centre. Major anchor tenants at the mall include Farmers and Countdown. NorthWest is owned and managed by Stride Property (formerly DNZ Property Fund).

At the time of its opening it was expected to create up to 700 jobs.

NorthWest Stage 2 was opened in October 2016 and contains restaurants, retailers and offices around Te Pumanawa Square. Another 300 jobs were created by the 7,700 square metre extension, in addition to the existing 700 jobs.

In 2017, Auckland Council and the developer of the mall sought dispute resolution over deferred payment of fees. There were also issues of use of a traffic island that was part of the council's plan for an intersection upgrade, and the need to abandon a bus interchange on a footpath that was on land owned by the developer.

As of 2017, the mall has 32,500 m2 of lettable area.

See also
 List of shopping centres in New Zealand

References

Shopping centres in the Auckland Region
Shopping malls established in 2015
2010s architecture in New Zealand
New Zealand companies established in 2015
West Auckland, New Zealand